Erynn Marshall (born c. 1977) is a Canadian old-time fiddler, ethnomusicologist, teacher, and author.

She is originally from Victoria, British Columbia and later lived in Gibsons, British Columbia. In 1998 she traveled to Toronto to pursue graduate studies at York University, graduating in 2003 with an M.A. degree in ethnomusicology. In 2006 she received an Appalachian Fellowship from Berea College in Kentucky, where studying Kentucky fiddle styles for three months. Her fiddle instructors include Melvin Wine, Lester McCumbers, Leland Hall, and Art Stamper.

She has performed with The Haints Old Time Stringband since 2007. In addition to playing, teaching, and writing about old-time music she also composes tunes. She has recorded with Eve Goldberg and Justin Rutledge.

Marshall has lived in Galax, Virginia since 2009. Since 2009 she has served as concert coordinator for the Blue Ridge Music Center.

She received a CBC Galaxie Rising Star Award in 2006 at the Edmonton Folk Music Festival. In 2008 she won the fiddle contest at the Clifftop festival in West Virginia, the first female and the first person from outside the United States to do so.

Discography

As leader
2005 - Calico

With Chris Coole
2007 - Meet Me in the Music

With Eve Goldberg
2007 - A Kinder Season

With The Haints Old Time Stringband
2009 - Shout Monah

With Justin Rutledge
2004 - No Never Alone

Books
2006 - Music in the Air Somewhere: The Shifting Borders of West  Virginia's Fiddle and Song Traditions. West Virginia University Press.

Films
Ill Fly Away Home (Bravo)
The Clifftop Experience (Outlook, West Virginia Public Broadcasting)

References

External links
Erynn Marshall official site
Erynn Marshall MySpace page
Erynn Marshall biography
The Haints Old Time Stringband site
Clifftop documentary featuring Erynn Marshall
Erynn Marshall Collection at the University of North Carolina Libraries

Canadian folk fiddlers
York University alumni
1970s births
Musicians from Victoria, British Columbia
People from Gibsons, British Columbia
People from Galax, Virginia
Canadian ethnomusicologists
Living people
Berea College alumni
21st-century Canadian violinists and fiddlers
Canadian country fiddlers
Canadian women violinists and fiddlers